Gamla, alt. sp. Gamala (The Camel) was an ancient Jewish city on the Golan Heights. It is believed to have been founded as a Seleucid fort during the Syrian Wars which was turned into a city under Hasmonean rule in 81 BCE. During the Great Revolt, it became an important stronghold for rebels and because of this Gamla is a symbol for the modern state of Israel and an important historical and archaeological site. It lies within the current Gamla nature reserve and is a prominent tourist attraction.

History
Situated at the southern part of the Golan, overlooking the Sea of Galilee, Gamla was built on a steep hill shaped like a camel's hump, from which it derives its name (Gamla meaning 'the camel' in Aramaic).

Early history
Archaeological excavations have shown that in the place of Gamla there was already a settlement in the Early Bronze Age. The settlement was probably agricultural, as archaeologists have found evidence of long-term use of flint sickles. Some of the findings even go back to the Copper Age.

The site became host to a Seleucid fort during the Syrian Wars (3rd century BCE), before later developing into a civilian settlement from the last quarter of the 2nd century BCE. In 81 BCE, it became a part of the Hasmonean state, according to Josephus, in The War of the Jews after Alexander Jannaeus captured it from the Seleucid ruler Demetrius Eucaerus.

The city became famous for producing high-quality olive oil. It was actively developed during the reign of Herod the Great, and later became a dispute between Herod Antipas and Nabatean King Aretas IV Philopatris.

Roman period
Josephus Flavius, Commander of Galilee during the Jewish Revolt against Rome, in 66 CE fortified Gamla as his main stronghold on the Golan. Josephus gives a very detailed topographical description of the city, which he also referred to as Gamala, and the steep ravines which precluded the need to build a wall around it. Only along the northern saddle, at the town's eastern extremity, was a 350 meters-long wall built. It was constructed by blocking gaps between existing houses and destroying houses that lay in its way.

Initially loyal to the Romans, Gamla turned rebellious under the influence of refugees from other locations. It was one of only five cities in the Galilee and Golan which stood against Vespasian's legions, reflecting the cooperation between the local population and the rebels. At the time of the revolt, the town minted its own coins, probably more as a means of propaganda than as currency. Bearing the inscription "For the redemption of Jerusalem the H(oly)" in a mixture of paleo-Hebrew (biblical) and Aramaic, only 6 of these coins have ever been found.

The city sustained the first seven-month siege, which was organized in 66 CE by Herod Agrippa II. On October 12, 67 CE a total of about 60 thousand soldiers under the command of Vespasian began a second siege. The inhabitants of the city, including armed rebels, were, according to Josephus, only 9,000 people. Kenneth Atkinson calls this number clearly exaggerated. Nevertheless, Dani Zion writes that before the siege Gamla became a refuge city, in which both insurgents from all over the Galilee and residents of the surrounding villages flocked. There were not enough places in the city, and even the city synagogue was adapted to accommodate refugees.

The seizure of the city was of fundamental importance to Vespasian. According to the existing strategy, it was necessary to seize and suppress all the centers of resistance along the route, however small. In addition, the Jews expected, albeit unreasonably, the possible assistance of fellow believers from Babylon and the military intervention of Parthia. Although Josephus, who led the consolidation of the defense of Gamla, describes it as a fortress, archaeological findings show that in fact the walls were constructed in fragments, filling in the gaps between buildings to create a continuous line of fortifications.

Josephus also provides a detailed description of the Roman siege and conquest of Gamla in 67 CE by components of legions X Fretensis, XV Apollinaris and V Macedonica. The Romans first attempted to take the city by means of a siege ramp, but were repulsed by the defenders. Only on the second attempt did the Romans succeed in breaching the walls at three different locations and invading the city. They then engaged the Jewish defenders in hand-to-hand combat up the steep hill. Fighting in the cramped streets from an inferior position, the Roman soldiers attempted to defend themselves from the roofs. These subsequently collapsed under the heavy weight, killing many soldiers and forcing a Roman retreat. The legionnaires re-entered the town a few days later, eventually beating Jewish resistance and completing the capture of Gamla.

Gamla is often compared with the more famous story of the fortress of Masada, where the defenders, not wanting to surrender to the Romans, committed suicide. Sometimes Gamla is even called the "Northern Masada" or "Masada Golan." However, Dani Zion emphasizes that Masada was a fortress, originally built as a fortification facility, where several hundred families of rebels were hiding and where there was no battle as such. Gamla, on the other hand was a city where fortification was carried out in connection with military operations and where real heavy fighting took place before the capture and destruction. According to Josephus, some 4,000 inhabitants were slaughtered, while 5,000, trying to escape down the steep northern slope, were either trampled to death, fell or perhaps threw themselves down a ravine. These appear to be exaggerated and the number of inhabitants on the eve of the revolt has been estimated at 3,000–4,000.

Identification

The Israel Antiquities Authority has, of late, taken the position that the ancient site of Gamla is to be identified with the site known as Tell es Salām (shown on map) which, itself, is a corruption of the Arabic word, es-Sanām (the hump). In previous years, the site had been identified with Tell ed-Drāʿ, a place ca.  east of Lake Tiberias in the Ruqqad river-bed, based on Konrad Furrer's identification of the site in 1889. It was only properly identified in 1968 by surveyor Itzhaki Gal, after the Israeli conquest of the Golan Heights during the Six-Day War. The site Tell es Salām was excavated by Shmarya Guttman and Danny Syon on behalf of the Israeli Department of Antiquities between 1977 and 2000. The excavations have uncovered 7.5 dunnams, about 5% of the site, revealing a typical Jewish city featuring ritual baths, Herodian lamps, limestone cups and thousands of Hasmonean coins. Additional excavations were carried out on the site in 2008 and 2010, by Haim Ben David and David Adan-Bayewitz on behalf of Bar Ilan University's Land of Israel Studies Department, and by Danny Syon on behalf of the Israel Antiquities Authority (IAA).

With the destruction of the town by the Roman army, Gamla was abandoned, never to be rebuilt. Archaeological excavations there have revealed widespread evidence for the battle that took place at the site. About 100 catapult bolts have been uncovered, as well as 1,600 arrowheads and 2,000 ballista stones, the latter all made from local basalt. This is a quantity unsurpassed anywhere in the Roman Empire. Most were collected along and in close proximity to the wall, placing the heavy fighting in the vicinity and the Roman siegecraft to the north east of the town. Next to a heavy concentration of the stones, the excavators have identified a man-made breach in the wall, probably made by a battering ram.

Archaeological finds

Archaeological finds in Gamla provided historians with a unique opportunity to study Jewish life at the end of the Second Temple period. In particular, studies prove that, although the active development of the Golan began under Alexander Jannaeus, the Jews began to settle here much earlier - at least in the second century BCE. This is shown by the large number of coins of the period of the reign of John Hyrcanus. In addition to coins, a large number of weapons were found in Gamla, a synagogue of the Second Temple period, various ritual objects, many different household items and jewelry.

About 200 artifacts excavated at Gamla have been identified as the remains of Roman army equipment. These include parts of Roman lorica segmentata, an officer's helmet visor and cheek-guard, bronze scales of another type of armor, as well as Roman identification tags.

A Roman siege-hook, used both for stabbing and hooking onto the wall, was found in the breach. Only one human jawbone was identified during the exploration of Gamla, raising questions regarding the absence of human remains despite the widespread evidence of a battle. A tentative answer is discussed by archaeologist Danny Syon, who suggests that the dead would have been buried at nearby mass graves that are yet to be found. One such mass grave has been found at Yodfat, which had suffered the same fate as Gamla at the hands of Vespasian's legions.

Artifacts from Gamla are on the display at the Golan Archaeological Museum, including arrowheads, ballista stones, clay oil lamps and coins minted in the town during the siege. A scale model and film are used to describe the conquest and destruction of the Jewish town and all of its inhabitants.

Weapons

One of the important successes of archaeologists was the discovery of a huge number of ancient weapons. The number of stone nuclei found in Gamla and arrowheads is a record for finds throughout the Roman Empire. In particular, about 2000 nuclei from basalt, 1600 metal arrowheads, parts of Roman helmets, armor, shields and many other weapons and military supplies were collected.

Coins
6,314 ancient coins were also found in Gamla, including unique coins of its own coinage. Most of them (6,164) were found during 14 seasons of excavation under the guidance of Gutman (1976-1989), 24 during conservation and restoration work in 1990–1991, and the remaining 126 during the four seasons of excavations conducted by Dani Zion and Zvi Yabur in the years 1997–2000. Another 153 coins from Gamla were subsequently found in the collection by the kibbutz Sasa. Among the found coins:

In total, 9 Gamla coins from the times of the uprising were found. Of these, 7 were found directly at Gamla, one in Alexandrium, and one from collectors (presumably stolen from Gamla). The Gamla coin, found in Alexandrium, testifies to contacts with the rebels in Galilee. Historians, in particular Dani Zion, Ya'akov Meshorer and David Eidlin, actively discussed the minting of insurgent coins outside of Jerusalem. As Eugene Wallenberg writes, this fact "opens the widest horizons for the historian in studying the social and economic history of the uprising, the study of the Zealots party as an independent and as a self-sufficient political formation." Researchers note the inscriptions on coins were made by craftsmen with low qualification, synthesizing Paleo-Hebrew and Aramaic letters: on one side is the inscription "Deliverance," on the other side, "Holy Jerusalem."

Shmaryahu Gutman wrote:

Synagogue

The remains of one of the earliest synagogues is situated inside the city walls. It was built of dressed stone with pillared aisles. Measuring 22 by 17 meters, its main hall was surrounded by a Doric colonnade, its corner columns were heart-shaped, and it was entered by twin doors at the south west. A ritual bath was unearthed next to it. On the eve of Gamla's destruction, the synagogue appears to have been converted to a dwelling for refugees, as testified by a number of meager fireplaces and large quantities of cookpots and storage jars found along its northern wall. Situated next to the city wall, 157 ballista stones were collected from the synagogue's hall alone and 120 arrowheads from its vicinity. The synagogue is thought to date from the late 1st century BCE and is among the oldest synagogues in the world.

The chronology of the synagogue was challenged by Ma'oz in 2012.  His interpretation is that it was built about 50 CE and a miqveh was added in 67 CE. The earlier "miqveh" was, in Ma'oz' understanding, a water cistern.

Present-day Gamla

In 2003, the territory of the ancient city was incorporated into the Gamla nature reserve, and is open to tourists. In addition to the ancient city, it includes the highest waterfall in Israeli-occupied territory, the ruins of a Byzantine settlement and many Neolithic dolmens.

Religious visitors sometimes hold bar mitzvahs in the ancient Gamla synagogue. In May 2010, the remains of the old town were damaged during a major forest fire caused by a fire from a projectile released during military exercises.

In Israel, there is a catch phrase "Gamla will not fall again," the meaning of which is that control of the Golan Heights is of strategic importance for ensuring the security of Israel. Benjamin Netanyahu, leader of the Likud party, said this in 2009, arguing the position that the Golan cannot return to Syria.

Gallery

See also
First Jewish Revolt coinage
Herodium
Machaerus
Masada

References

Notes

Bibliography

 Josephus, Flavius. William Whiston, A.M., translator (1895). The Works of Flavius Josephus – Antiquities of the Jews. Auburn and Buffalo, New York: John E. Beardsley. Retrieved 16 October 2010.
 Josephus, Flavius. William Whiston, A.M., translator (1895). The Works of Flavius Josephus – The Wars of the Jews. Auburn and Buffalo, New York: John E. Beardsley. Retrieved 16 October 2010.

External links

 Gamla on the Israel Antiquities Authority website.
 Gamla on the Israel Nature and Parks Authority website.
Vultures of Gamla
Romans on the Roofs of Gamla on Segula Jewish History magazine website

Jews and Judaism in the Roman Empire
Ancient Jewish settlements of the Golan Heights
Archaeological sites on the Golan Heights
Classical sites on the Golan Heights
Former populated places on the Golan Heights
Establishments in the Seleucid Empire
Israel National Heritage Site
First Jewish–Roman War
Mountain monuments and memorials
Populated places established in the 3rd century BC
60s disestablishments in the Roman Empire
Tells (archaeology)